Ethel Magafan (August 10, 1916 – April 24, 1993) was an American painter and muralist.

Early life
Ethel Magafan was born in Chicago to Greek parents who had recently immigrated to the U.S. The family soon relocated to Colorado Springs, Colorado, and Magafan's artistic training occurred at the Colorado Springs Fine Arts Center under the tutelage of Peppino Mangravite, Boardman Robinson and Frank Mechau, who hired Magafan and her twin sister, Jenne, to assist on mural projects. In 1937, aEthel won the commission to paint a mural in the U.S. post office in Auburn, Nebraska, making her the youngest recipient of such a commission. It would be the first of seven government-sponsored commissions for the artist.

Murals

Under President Franklin Roosevelt's New Deal, several programs were created to employ Americans during the Great Depression. The Magafan twins worked under the New Deal's Section of Painting and Sculpture, a program that hired thousands of artists to paint murals in public spaces, particularly post offices. Ethel and her twin sister, Jenne Magafan, became widely known for their murals painted during the Great Depression. Ethel received her first of seven Government commissions when she was commissioned to produce a painting for the United States post office in Auburn, Nebraska titled Threshing. Other murals commissioned by the US Government hang in the United States Senate Chamber, the Social Security Building and the Recorder Deeds Building in Washington D.C., and in post offices in Wynne, Arkansas titled Cotton Pickers in 1940; in Madill, Oklahoma titled Prairie Fire in 1941; and Englewood, Colorado titled The Horse Corral in 1942. Her final mural, entitled Grant in the Wilderness, was installed in 1979 in the Chancellorsville Visitor Center at the Fredericksburg National Memorial Military Park in Virginia,

She was a member of the National Academy of Design.

Death
Magafan died April 24, 1993 in Woodstock New York at the age of 76.

References

 Biography

1916 births
1993 deaths
Artists from Chicago
Artists from Colorado Springs, Colorado
American muralists
American twins
American women painters
Artists of the American West
20th-century American painters
Section of Painting and Sculpture artists
20th-century American women artists
Women muralists